Isin Rural District is a rural district (dehestan) in the Central District of Bandar Abbas County, Hormozgan Province, Iran. At the 2006 census, its population was 20,735, with 4,990 families. The rural district has 47 villages.

References 

Rural Districts of Hormozgan Province
Bandar Abbas County